Wiregrass is a common name for several plants

Wiregrass may refer to:

 Poaceae grasses
 Aristida (three-awns), especially Aristida stricta (Pineland Three-awn), Aristida junciformis and Aristida purpurea (Purple Three-awn), of subfamily Arundinoideae
 Eleusine indica (Indian Goosegrass) of subfamily Eragrostideae
 Sporobolus indicus (Smutgrass) of subfamily Chloridoideae
 Cynodon dactylon (Bermuda Grass) of subfamily Chloridoideae
 Ventenata dubia of subfamily Pooideae, native to the Mediterranean and naturalized in western North America
 Other plants
 Juncus tenuis (Slender Rush) of the rush family
 Polygonum arenastrum (Common Knotweed) of the knotweed family

See also
 Wiregrass Region, an area of the Southern United States encompassing parts of southern Georgia, southeastern Alabama and the Florida Panhandle, and named for its abundance of Aristida stricta